Ebenezer Fontes Braga (born April 14, 1969) is a retired Brazilian mixed martial artist and kickboxer, Pride veteran. He competed in the Light Heavyweight division.  Well known as one of fighters who hold multiple wins at one night few times.

Background
Ebenezer Braga trained in Muay tai and bjj gym.

MMA
Braga started his career at "Circuito de Lutas 3" in 1995. After defeating Agrinaldo Ralei he loss to Jorge Pereira. After two wins he took part at "Brazilian Vale Tudo Fighting 1" in next year and hold two wins at one night. In the same year he took part at "Freestyle de Belem 1" and hold three wins at that night. He was defeated by Kevin Randleman and Dan Severn next year. After defeating Branden Lee Hinkle he made debut in UFC and defeated Jeremy Horn at UFC Brazil. In 1999 he loss to Kazushi Sakuraba by armbar at his debut in Pride 6. At next fight he loss to Akira Shoji by decision at  PRIDE Grand Prix 2000 Opening Round and defeated Daijiro Matsui at PRIDE 15. He lost his last fight at JF 2 - Jungle Fight 2 against Fabrício Werdum on May 15, 2004.

Kickboxing
Braga took part in K-1 grand-prix in 2001. After defeating Kenji Kusatsu at quarterfinal he loss to Jerome Lebanner in semifinal. At the same year he made draw with Akio Mori. On October 8, 2001, he was scheduled to fight against Cyril Abidi at the "K-1 World GP 2001 in Fukuoka", but he was forced to withdraw due to poor physical condition. On June 2, 2002, he was scheduled to fight Nicholas Pettas at "K-1 Survival 2002", but was forced to withdraw due to a nasal bone fracture.

Personal life
Ebenezer Braga retired from competition in 2004. He moved to United States in 2014 and he became pastor at the same year.


Mixed martial arts record

|-
| Loss
| align=center| 13-7-2
| Fabrício Werdum
| KO (punch)
| Jungle Fight 2
| 
| align=center| 2
| align=center| 1:28
| Manaus, Brazil
| 
|-
| Win
| align=center| 13-6-2
| Erik Wanderley
| Decision
| Heat FC 2: Evolution
| 
| align=center| 3
| align=center| 5:00
| Natal, Brazil
| 
|-
| Win
| align=center| 12-6-2
| Rodrigo Gripp de Sousa
| Technical Submission (guillotine choke)
| Jungle Fight 1
| 
| align=center| 1
| align=center| 0:33
| Manaus, Brazil
| 
|-
| Loss
| align=center| 11-6-2
| Forrest Griffin
| Submission (rear-naked choke)
| Heat FC 1: Genesis
| 
| align=center| 1
| N/A
| Natal, Brazil
| 
|-
|  Draw
| align=center| 11-5-2
| Gary Goodridge
| Draw
| Inoki Bom-Ba-Ye 2001
| 
| align=center| 5
| align=center| 3:00
| Saitama, Japan
| K-1 vs. Pride rules match
|-
| Win
| align=center| 11-5-1
| Daijiro Matsui
| Decision
| PRIDE 15
| 
| align=center| 3
| align=center| 5:00
| Saitama, Japan
| 
|-
| Loss
| align=center| 10-5-1
| Akira Shoji
| Decision
| PRIDE Grand Prix 2000 Opening Round
| 
| align=center| 1
| align=center| 15:00
| Tokyo, Japan
| 
|-
| Loss
| align=center| 10-4-1
| Kazushi Sakuraba
| Submission (armbar)
| Pride 6
| 
| align=center| 1
| align=center| 9:23
| Yokohama, Japan
| 
|-
|  Draw
| align=center| 10-3-1
| Masakatsu Funaki
| Draw
| Pancrase - Breakthrough 4
| 
| align=center| 1
| align=center| 15:00
| Yokohama, Japan
| 
|-
| Win
| align=center| 10-3
| Jeremy Horn
| Submission (standing guillotine choke)
| UFC Brazil
| 
| align=center| 1
| align=center| 3:27
| São Paulo, Brazil
| 
|-
| Win
| align=center| 9-3
| Branden Lee Hinkle
| Submission (triangle choke)
| IVC 6: The Challenge
| 
| align=center| 1
| align=center| 12:33
| Brazil
| 
|-
| Loss
| align=center| 8-3
| Dan Severn
| TKO (doctor stoppage)
| IVC 1: Real Fight Tournament
| 
| align=center| 1
| align=center| 8:17
| Brazil
| 
|-
| Loss
| align=center| 8-2
| Kevin Randleman
| Decision
| Universal Vale Tudo Fighting 6
| 
| align=center| 1
| align=center| 20:00
| Brazil
| 
|-
| Win
| align=center| 8-1
| Rei Zulu
| N/A
| Freestyle de Belem 1
| 
| align=center| N/A
| N/A
| Belém, Brazil
| 
|-
| Win
| align=center| 7-1
| Silvio Vieira
| N/A
| Freestyle de Belem 1
| 
| align=center| N/A
| N/A
| Belém, Brazil
| 
|-
| Win
| align=center| 6-1
| Francisco Nonato
| N/A
| Freestyle de Belem 1
| 
| align=center| N/A
| N/A
| Belém, Brazil
| 
|-
| Win
| align=center| 5-1
| Fernando Cerchiari
| TKO (doctor stoppage)
| Brazilian Vale Tudo Fighting 1
| 
| align=center| 1
| align=center| 4:06
| Brazil
| 
|-
| Win
| align=center| 4-1
| Carlos Alberto Regis
| TKO (submission to strikes)
| Brazilian Vale Tudo Fighting 1
| 
| align=center| 1
| align=center| 2:20
| Brazil
| 
|-
| Win
| align=center| 3-1
| Naohisa Kawamura
| KO (punches)
| Universal Vale Tudo Fighting 1
| 
| align=center| 1
| align=center| 3:17
| Japan
| 
|-
| Win
| align=center| 2-1
| Drago Drago
| TKO (submission to strikes)
| Gaisei Challenge Vale Tudo 2
| 
| align=center| 1
| align=center| 1:03
| Brazil
| 
|-
| Loss
| align=center| 1-1
| Jorge Pereira
| TKO (strikes)
| Circuito de Lutas 3
| 
| align=center| 1
| align=center| 11:18
| Brazil
| 
|-
| Win
| align=center| 1-0
| Agrinaldo Ralei
| TKO (submission to strikes)
| Circuito de Lutas 3
| 
| align=center| 1
| align=center| 1:24
| Brazil
|

Kickboxing record (incomplete)

|-  bgcolor="#c5d2ea"
| 2001-6-24 || Draw ||align=left| Akio Mori || K-1: Survival 2001 || Sendai, Japan|| Decision (Majority)  || 3 || 5:00 ||1-1-1
|-  bgcolor="#FFBBBB"
|  2001-04-29 || Loss ||align=left| Jerome LeBanner ||  K-1: Osaka 2001 || Osaka, Japan ||  Ko (Punch)  || 1 || 1:31 ||1-1
|-  bgcolor="#CCFFCC"
| 2001-04-29 || Win||align=left| Kenji Kusatsu || K-1: Osaka 2001 || Osaka, Japan|| Ko (Punch) || 2 || 1:20 || 1-0

References

External links
 
 

Brazilian male mixed martial artists
Light heavyweight mixed martial artists
Mixed martial artists utilizing Muay Thai
Mixed martial artists utilizing Luta Livre
Sportspeople from Rio de Janeiro (city)
Living people
1969 births
Brazilian Muay Thai practitioners
Ultimate Fighting Championship male fighters